The Rabble are a New Zealand punk band from Auckland, New Zealand, with a street punk aesthetic that was formed by brothers Charles Hill-Hayr (Chazz Rabble) and Rupert Hill-Hayr in the 2000 while still attending Orewa College.  Their official Myspace page went live on 29 February 2004. They collaborated with Mark Unseen of Boston band The Unseen to create the song and video for "This World is Dead" from their album The Battle's Almost Over. The Rabble went on tour in the UK and Europe from August 2009 to January 2010, as well as writing and recording for their next album. They recorded at York Street Studios in Auckland early in 2008, and the bass and guitars were tracked at Number 8 Wire recording studio, by Chazz Rabble.

In April 2010, they were in the line-up at Punk & Disorderly Festival in Berlin. On 1 August 2011, The Rabble released Life's A Journey. They were the second band to be announced for Rebellion Festival in 2013 along with Left Alone after their successful show at Rebellion in 2009. They were joined by The Casualties and The Exploited. In the early demos they had more of a punk-core sound (street punk) as opposed to the recent pop rock sound they had adopted. The lyrics were sometimes in English and some times in Malay, due to the original vocalist's (Ben) mother tongue of Malaysian. They also played with an Auckland-based Thai street punk band, Chaos City who, at one point, played for Missing Teeth and the Rudies and made their name in the underground Necropolis venue on the outskirts of the Auckland CBD.

They have mixed reactions and reviews in the New Zealand punk scene, some love them and others hate them, having been criticized for being 'sell outs' by puritanical punks. It could be argued that they never 'bought in' in the first place and used the underground as a stepping stone. Inactive for a few years, Chazz Rabble and Rupe Rabble both have solo projects.

Members
Chazz Rabble (Chazz Hill-Hayr) – vocals, guitar
Rupe Rabble (Rupert Hill-Hayr) – vocals, drums
Jamie Rabble (Jamie Douglass) – bass, vocals

Discography

Studio albums
No Clue, No Future (March 2006)
The Battle's Almost Over (February 2007)
The New Generation (December 2008)
Life's A Journey (August 2011)

EPs
This Is Our Lives (November 2006)

References

External links
Official band website
Official Myspace site
Interview with THE RABBLE on Scanner zine from 2007
Interview with Rupe on Scanner zine from 2009
The Rabble Last FM
The Rabble YouTube

New Zealand punk rock groups